Sean Casey (born February 1, 1972) is an American professional wrestler who wrestles on the Southeast independent circuit. He has made appearances in World Championship Wrestling, the World Wrestling Federation, and in Total Nonstop Action Wrestling. He also appeared in the magazine Playgirl in 1997.

Professional wrestling career
Casey began his career in 1995, making appearances in World Championship Wrestling (WCW) under the names Steve Casey and K.C. Sunshine. He did not become well known till he posed for Playgirl in 1997. In 1998 he wrestled a few matches for the World Wrestling Federation (WWF) on WWF Shotgun Saturday Night against Too Much. Casey then signed a contract with the WWF and began working in their developmental territory Ohio Valley Wrestling (OVW).

Then in 2003, he worked a few matches for Total Nonstop Action Wrestling (TNA) on TNA Xplosion. In 2005 he regularly worked for Blue Water Championship Wrestling, Ultimate Championship Wrestling, and Ohio Championship Wrestling. He then began wrestling in Showtime All-Star Wrestling and United States Wrestling Organization in Tennessee.

Presently, he tours with and is a founding member of the 5 Most Wanted.

Personal life
Sean has 1 adult daughter and is presently single. He resides on Cincinnati's east side with his dog, Amiga.

Championships and accomplishments
304 Wrestling
304 Championship (2 times)
304 Tag Team Championship (2 time) - with Buff Bagwell & with Brian Masters
Blue Water Championship Wrestling
BWCW Cruiserweight Championship (1 time)
BWCW Heavyweight Championship (2 times)
Frontier Elite Wrestling
2009 Total Elimination Champion(2 time)
FEW Championship (2 time)
Future Great Wrestling
FGW Championship (1 time)
Heartland Wrestling Association
HWA Tag Team Championship (1 time) - with Brian Taylor
NWA Circle City Wrestling
NWA CCW Tag Team Championship (1 time) – with Rob Conway
Northern Wrestling Federation
NWF Tag Team Championship (1 time) – with Chris Harris
Ohio Championship Wrestling
OCW Heavyweight Championship (2 times, first)
OCW United States Championship (1 time)
Ohio Valley Wrestling
OVW Light Heavyweight Championship (3 times)
Showtime All-Star Wrestling
SAW Tag Team Championship (1 time) - with Chris Michaels
Universal Championship Wrestling
UCW Heavyweight Championship (1 time)
Vendetta Pro Wrestling
Vendetta Pro Wrestling Heavyweight Championship (1 time, Inaugural)
Vendetta Pro Wrestling International Tag Team Championship (1 time, current) - with Cody Hawk
Casino Royal Royal Rumble (2014) 
Cauliflower Alley Cup (2014)
World Class Professional Big Time Wrestling
WCPBTW Ohio State Tag Team Championship (1 time) - with Bobby Fulton

References

External links
Online World of Wrestling Profile
Sean Casey Bio

1972 births
American male professional wrestlers
Living people